Israel and the Arabs: Elusive Peace is the name of a three-part British documentary series shown in October 2005 on BBC Two about the attempts to settle the Israeli–Palestinian conflict after the 2000 Camp David Summit.

The series was produced by Norma Percy, who had produced The Death of Yugoslavia before. Like her previous series, Israel and the Arabs: Elusive Peace relies extensively on in-depth interviews with key players involved in this issue, such as Ehud Barak, Bill Clinton, and Colin Powell.

Episodes

References

External links
Israel and the Arabs: Elusive Peace at bbc.co.uk
Israel and the Arabs: Elusive Peace at imdb.com

2005 British television series debuts
2005 British television series endings
Arab–Israeli peace process
BBC television documentaries
Documentary television series about war